Get a  Life is an album by British punk band Vice Squad. It was released in 1999 by High Speed Records.

Track listing
 "Get a Life"
 "You Can't Buy Back the Dead"
 "Princess Parandia"
 "The Great Fire of London"
 "Westend Stars"
 "Maid to Measure"
 "Allergy"
 "Business as Usual"
 "No You Don't"
 "Powerdrill"
 "Take Too Many E's"

References

1999 albums
Vice Squad albums